The Battle of Buck Head Creek (also known as Buckhead Creek and Reynolds' Plantation) was the second battle of Sherman's March to the Sea, fought November 28, 1864, during the American Civil War. Union Army cavalry under Brig. Gen. Hugh Judson Kilpatrick repulsed an attack by the small Confederate cavalry corps under Maj. Gen. Joseph Wheeler, but abandoned its attempt to destroy railroads and rescue Union prisoners of war.

Battle

On November 26, Wheeler caught up with two lagging Union regiments, attacked their camp, chased them to the larger force and prevented Kilpatrick from destroying the Briar Creek trestle. Kilpatrick instead destroyed a mile of track in the area. When Kilpatrick discovered that the Union prisoners at Camp Lawton had been taken to other unknown sites, he began to move southwest to join up with Maj. Gen. William T. Sherman's headquarters.

Kilpatrick's men encamped near Buck Head Creek on the night of November 27. Wheeler came along the next morning, almost captured Kilpatrick, and pursued him and his men to Buck Head Creek. As Kilpatrick's main force crossed the creek, the 5th Ohio Cavalry regiment, under Col. Thomas T. Heath, supported by two artillery pieces, fought a rearguard action from behind a barricade of rails, severely punishing Wheeler's troopers with canister fire and then burned the bridge behind them. Wheeler soon crossed and followed, but a Union brigade behind barricades at Reynolds' Plantation halted the Rebels' drive, eventually forcing them to retire. Kilpatrick rode on to rejoin Sherman at Louisville, Georgia.

Aftermath
Union casualties were reported as 46.  Kilpatrick claimed/estimated 600 Confederate casualties, but Wheeler reported approximately 70, including Brig. Gen. Felix H. Robertson, severely wounded in the elbow.

Notes

References
 National Park Service battle description
 CWSAC Report Update and Resurvey: Individual Battlefield Profiles
 Eicher, David J. The Longest Night: A Military History of the Civil War. New York: Simon & Schuster, 2001. .
 Rigdon, John C. The Battles for Buckhead Creek and Waynesborough. Cartersville, GA: Eastern Digital Resources, 2005. .
 The Union Army; A History of Military Affairs in the Loyal States, 1861–65 — Records of the Regiments in the Union Army — Cyclopedia of Battles — Memoirs of Commanders and Soldiers. Wilmington, NC: Broadfoot Publishing, 1997. First published 1908 by Federal Publishing Company.
 Southern Historical Society Papers Volume 12, 1884
 Battle of Waynesborough historynet.com

Jenkins County, Georgia
Buck Head Creek
Buck Head Creek
Buck Head Creek
Buck Head Creek
Buck Head Creek
1864 in Georgia (U.S. state)
November 1864 events